H. H. Franklin Manufacturing Company was founded in 1893 by industrialist Herbert H. Franklin in Syracuse, New York. The company specialized in machine die casting and produced small parts such as gears and bearing caps. It was the first company in the world in that enterprise.

Franklin Manufacturing and its subsidiaries, except its aircraft engine branch, closed in 1934 due to bankruptcy.

References

Franklin Manufacturing
Franklin Manufacturing
Manufacturing companies established in 1893
Manufacturing companies disestablished in 1934
1893 establishments in New York (state)
1934 disestablishments in New York (state)